Pike Township is an inactive township in Carter County, in the U.S. state of Missouri.

Pike Township was established in the 1890s, taking its name from Pike Creek.

References

Townships in Missouri
Townships in Carter County, Missouri